Alexander Gordon MacWilliam  (22 August 1923 - 24 October 2014) was an Anglican priest.

MacWilliam was educated at the Universities of Wales and  London.  He was ordained in  1947 and began his career with a curacy at  Penygroes. From 1949 to 1955 he was a Minor Canon of Bangor Cathedral. From then until 1958 he was Rector of Llanfaethlu after which he was at Trinity College, Carmarthen until 1984.  In that year he became  Dean of St David's, a post he held for 6 years.

References

1923 births
People educated at Llanelli Boys' Grammar School
Alumni of the University of Wales
Alumni of the University of London
People associated with Trinity University College
Welsh Anglicans
Deans of St Davids
2014 deaths